Festuca pseudodalmatica is a species of grass which can be found in Central, Eastern and southeastern Europe.

Description
The ligule is going around the eciliate membrane. They are mid-green in colour and are pruinose.

Fertile florets are  diminished at the apex and have 4–7 fertile florets. It also have a palea that have a ciliolate keels and hairy surface. The glumes are chartaceous, linear and keelless while the apexes and size are different.

Lemma itself have smooth surface, eciliate margins, and acuminate apex. Flowers have three stamens while the fruits are ellipsoid and have caryopses with an additional pericarp. Hilum is linear.

References

pseudodalmatica
Flora of Europe